Haute-Kotto is one of the 16 prefectures of the Central African Republic.  Its capital is Bria. It is the largest prefecture in the Central African Republic.

References

 
Prefectures of the Central African Republic